The Australian HPV Super Series is an annual championship held in South Australia and Western Australia featuring velomobiles racing around enclosed circuits for a period between 6 and 24 hours.

The largest event of its kind anywhere in the world, it attracts teams from all around Australia, and even overseas. Since 2018, the championship has consisted of six races, culminating in the 24 hour event at Murray Bridge.

2021 Australian HPV Super Series

Dates

Updates during the races at Loxton, Adelaide, and Murray Bridge are live streamed on the AHPVSS Facebook and YouTube pages.

History
In 1985, what would become the inaugural Pedal Prix race was held in the car park of what was at the time the Underdale Campus of the University of South Australia on Holbrooks Road. There were less than a dozen participating teams. This event marks the start of the Australian HPV Super Series and at the time it generated tremendous interest. Vehicles varied considerably in sophistication and quality but the potential to get students involved in designing, making and testing the vehicles was readily apparent.

In 1986 the event was moved to the Road Safety Centre on Oaklands Road in Marion (later turned into a wetlands) to cater for the increased number of teams. Rules and standards were developed to guide teams in building vehicles so that they were safer. This site was considerably more complex with many corners and a hill to test riders and their vehicles.

The popularity of the event continued to grow and it soon became apparent that the number of entries was growing beyond the capacity of the Road Safety Centre. As a result, in 1992 the event was moved to the Adelaide International Raceway at Virginia. This site easily catered for the increased number of entries. The wider, flatter track saw records for the distance travelled in the 24 hour endurance race increase. A major disadvantage of this site has been its openness and exposure to weather. Wind, dust and an uninteresting track layout had the committee looking for alternatives. 1996 marked the last time that petrol driven hybrids were allowed to participate. At various stages throughout the history of the 24 hour race there have been categories for petrol and solar hybrids as well as a commuter category where more than one rider was in the vehicle.

1997 saw the event moved to Sturt Reserve, Murray Bridge, where for the first time public roads were sealed off specially for the event. It was felt that the new venue would comfortably accommodate the number of entries anticipated, provide a greater challenge for teams and provide a better atmosphere for all competitors, spectators and visitors. The field at the first Murray Bridge totalled 90 teams. The record size for the competing field at Murray Bridge was 228 set in 2009.

In 2003, The HPV Super Series began, with a championship season that spanned four races. They included two 3 hour sprints on the same day and later a 6-hour race all at Victoria Park and then concluded with the 24 hour Murray Bridge event. The two 3 hour sprints were then replaced with a single 6 hour race. A 9-hour race was trialed once during 2009 for race 2 at Victoria Park.

The 2013 Murray Bridge event was the first to include teams representing five states/territories with teams from South Australia, Victoria, Western Australia, New South Wales and the Northern Territory present.

In 2014, a street circuit in Loxton, South Australia was introduced as the new opening race of a four-race championship. In addition, the McNamara Park circuit near Mount Gambier and a street circuit in Busselton, Western Australia were introduced as non-series events. The Murray Bridge street circuit remained as the final race of the series and the two Victoria Park races also remained unchanged.

In 2017, the McNamara Park circuit was upgraded to a series event as the opening race of the series. In 2018, the race in Busselton was also upgraded to a series event as the penultimate race.

On 14 December 2017, it was announced by the Australian HPV Super Series and the Victorian HPV Grand Prix Series that National Vehicle Specifications had been adopted for the 2018 season onward, subjecting both series to common vehicle specifications and making it easier for teams to compete across both series without needing to change their vehicle set-ups; in previous years, both series had their own specification guidelines to comply with.

For the 2016 and 2017 seasons, in all races apart from Murray Bridge, race days were separated for Category 4 (Saturday) and the remaining categories (Sunday). This was scaled back to only include the two Victoria Park races for the 2018-19 seasons.

Notable riders
Steele Von Hoff (Tru Blu Racing)
Patrick Jonker (DMR Racing)
Darcy Strudwick (Gtrikes Factory Racing)

Racing Categories & Divisions
The four categories are divided under two classifications of "School Categories" and "Community Categories". Introduced in 2006, all school and community categories have further sub-categories for All Female teams.

The following category criteria are accurate as of the 2020 season.

Point System 

From 2014 season each team's best two rounds from the 6 hour races are added to their result from the 24 hour race to determine their Series Championship total. From 2016, points are allocated by category result instead of overall result.

Events

Mount Gambier, South Australia

This race, currently held in April is eight hours long and is held at McNamara Park, just outside of Mount Gambier, South Australia, on a 2.4 km closed circuit. The track made its debut in 2014 as an 8-hour non-series race before being integrated into the main series in 2017.

Loxton, South Australia

This race, currently held in May, is six hours long and take place at Loxton, South Australia on a 1.37 km street circuit that incorporates Loxton's large center roundabout. The track made its debut for the 2014 season as a six-hour race. There was a slight modification made to the track at the 2018 race. This track heavily favors lighter bikes due to the climb on the southern side of the track.

Fastest Individual Racing Lap

Greatest Race Distance

Victoria Park, Adelaide, South Australia

This race, currently held in June and July respectively, are six hours long and take place at Victoria Park, Adelaide on a closed-criterium track which is 1.354 km long. The fastest teams can achieve distances of over 250 km during these races.
The Victoria Park track is now in its third incarnation. Prior to 2009 the track included an uphill segment of Wakefield Rd.
From 2009 to 2012 the track used the southern hairpin and start line of the Adelaide Street Circuit and a new section running parallel to Wakefield Street. Late in 2012 it was confirmed by the Adelaide City Council that the redevelopment of Victoria Park had been given the green light. The redevelopment now includes an extension to the short track to take it past the heritage grandstand present on the site. This track heavily favors the most aerodynamic bikes due to the lack of slow corners.

Fastest Individual Racing Lap

Greatest Race Distance

Busselton, Western Australia 

In 2014, a new race on an 850 m street circuit in Busselton, Western Australia was announced. It is currently the only event in the AHPVSS outside of South Australia. It was initially a non-series round used to promote HPV racing in Western Australia. This was upgraded into a series event in 2018. The track is located mainly in a carpark on the foreshore of Busselton. It is tight and twisty with three hairpins. Since 2014 it has been a 6 hour race, but the Busselton City Council is in talks with the AIPP about the possibility of holding a 24 hour event.

Murray Bridge, South Australia

The Australian HPV Super Series concludes in September with what is considered to be the premier HPV event in the country, the 24-hour, final race at Sturt Reserve in Murray Bridge. The event now attracts over 30,000 spectators and participants annually, becoming an economic boom for the town. It attracts the best teams from all over the country to what is considered the toughest and most competitive race. The closed-circuit track is, as of 2016, 1.7 km long containing a series of left and right hand corners, fast straights and challenging corners. When flooded with over 200 teams it makes for genuinely tricky and exciting racing, The elite teams may cover over  during the race. The race starts at 12:00 pm on Saturday and concludes 24 hours later. (note: In 2007 the race was stopped early due to gale-force winds, and in 2017 the race started 4 hours later than the scheduled start also due to strong winds).

During the first race at Murray Bridge in 1997, the track followed the roads that bordered Sturt Reserve in a closed circuit. In 2000, the Northern Hairpin along Olympic Drive and Janesh Road was added, lengthening the track by 366 metres. In 2004 the corner leading up to the main straight was transformed to its current shape (shortening the track by 40m). This corner has had various sponsors names associated with it, and is currently called 'Belotti Corner,' but it is known popularly among riders and spectators alike as "Crash Corner". The Southern Straight was resurfaced in 2011, removing the roughest section of the track. In 2016, the track was shortened to its current form, by-passing the Northern Hairpin due to the mills on that section of Janesh Road having to remain open during the event.

This track requires bikes to have good aerodynamics, minimal weight and decent handling.

Friday Qualifier & Saturday Shootout

In 2005, a timed Friday night practice session was introduced. This session is used to determine the grid positions for the start of the race the following day. This also included the introduction of a Top 12 Shootout where the three fastest teams from each category were given the opportunity to set a lap time on a clear track on Saturday morning before the start of the race to determine the top 12 positions on the grid.

In 2008, the shootout was expanded to a Top 15 shootout to include the fastest all female team from categories 1, 2 and 3.
The shootout has quickly become a crowd favourite since its introduction. Large crowds gather around the track to cheer on the fastest teams as they are given the opportunity to push their trikes to the limit on a clear track. Top teams exceed 70 km/h on the main straight during their flying lap.

Murray Bridge Records

Winners 24 Hour Pedal Prix - Murray Bridge

1997

1998

1999

2000

2001

2002

2003

Special Note Bendigo Youth Racings victory over Team Ballistic was the closest in the events history with only 10 seconds separating them after 24 hours.

2004

2005

2006

2007

Special Note The 2007 race was only 23 hours long as it had to be cut short by an hour due to gale force winds.

2008

2009

2010

2011

2012

2013

2014

2015

2016 

Special Note Due to the mill now operating during the race, a different track was used, removing the hairpin at the north of the course.

2017

2018

Previous Championships

2006 Championship

2007 Championship

2008 Championship

2009 Championship

2010 Championship

2011 Championship

2012 Championship

2013 Championship

2014 Championship

2015 Championship

2016 Championship

Note: At the conclusion of the Cat 1-3 race at Victoria Park (Round 2), protests were lodged against 2 category 3 teams (Team 22 Trisled Development Team and Team 316 GTrikes Matrix) with the complaint being that both Trisled and GTrikes fielded riders who had finished school. Due to the rulebook being unclear for the eligibility of category 3 riders, the rule could be interpreted both ways which subsequently led to the disqualification of both Trisled and GTrikes. The official ruling pointed this out -  "Neither Team 22 (Trisled) nor 316 (GTrikes) has sought to gain an unfair advantage. They have appraised AIPP of their intentions throughout and have been open and honest with AIPP. The interpretation of the rule by AIPP as it is currently written was incorrect. AIPP unreservedly apologises to both teams for the error in interpretation."

2017 Championship

Championship Records

Other Australian HPV Races
  Queensland - RACQ Technology Challenge
  Tasmania - RACT Insurance Challenge
  Victoria - Victorian HPV Series
  Victoria - Maroondah Grand Prix
  Victoria - RACV Energy Breakthrough

References

Notes

External links

 
 Pedal Prix 1996 & 1997

Human-powered vehicles
Racing
Sports competitions in South Australia
Sports competitions in Western Australia